Parablechnum novae-zelandiae, synonym Blechnum novae-zelandiae, commonly known as palm-leaf fern or kiokio, is a species of fern found in New Zealand. It can often be found growing in clay soil on embankments and roadsides.

P. novae-zelandiae has long fronds that grow up to 2 metres long by 50 cm wide. They are pink when new and as they age they turn green and darken.

References 

Blechnaceae
Ferns of New Zealand
Plants described in 1998